Ulan (born November 1962), also romanized as Ulagan, or Wulan, is a Chinese politician of Mongol heritage, serving since 2016 as the Deputy Communist Party Secretary of Hunan. She spent most of her career in her native Inner Mongolia and rose through the ranks of the Communist Youth League.

Biography
Ulan was born to an ethnic Mongol family in Horqin Left Middle Banner of Jirem League (now Tongliao). She became involved in politics when she was a mere sixteen years old, when she began working for the Communist Youth League (CYL) office in Baotou. In September 1980, she graduated from Baotou Normal School, specializing in political instruction. She continued her involvement in the Youth League after, taking up a series of roles in its organization in Baotou. In June 1987 she was named deputy secretary of the Inner Mongolia CYL organization. In November 1996, the 34 year old Ulan was promoted to secretary.

In February 2000, she left the Youth League system to take up the post of deputy secretary of Ikh Juu League, then deputy party chief of Ordos. In March 2003 she was named governor of Bayannur League. In November 2003 she was named Vice Chairman of Inner Mongolia. In November 2006 she was promoted one step further to the propaganda department head of the Inner Mongolia party organization and a member of the regional party standing committee.

In November 2016, Ulan broke convention and became Deputy Party Secretary of Hunan province in south-central China, becoming the first ethnic minority woman to take on a deputy party secretary-ship outside of her home region.

Ulan is an alternate member of the 18th Central Committee of the Communist Party of China, and a deputy to the 12th National People's Congress.

References

1962 births
Living people
People's Republic of China politicians from Inner Mongolia
Chinese Communist Party politicians from Inner Mongolia
20th-century Chinese women politicians
People from Tongliao
21st-century Chinese women politicians
21st-century Chinese politicians
Alternate members of the 18th Central Committee of the Chinese Communist Party
Alternate members of the 19th Central Committee of the Chinese Communist Party